Elections to Oldham Council were held on 5 May 2011. One third of the council was up for election.

Labour gained overall control of the council.

After the election, the composition of the council was

Labour 34
Liberal Democrat 21
Conservative 5

Election result

Ward results

Alexandra ward

Chadderton Central ward

Chadderton North ward

Chadderton South ward

Coldhurst ward

Crompton ward

Failsworth East ward

Failsworth West ward

Hollinwood ward

Medlock Vale ward

Royton North ward

Royton South ward

Saddleworth North ward

Saddleworth South ward

Saddleworth West and Lees ward

St James ward

St Marys ward

Shaw ward

Waterhead ward

Werneth ward

References

2011 English local elections
2011
2010s in Greater Manchester